Namagate is a political corruption scandal involving the former First Minister of Northern Ireland, Peter Robinson. The alleged corruption surrounds the sale of a portfolio of loans by the National Asset Management Agency (Nama) in April 2014. It is alleged that Robinson stood to benefit from a £7.5m "fixers' fee" upon the completion of the sale.

Project Eagle 
'Project Eagle' was the name Nama gave to their sale of a portfolio of Northern Irish loans and properties. The portfolio was originally worth £4.5bn, but it was bought from Irish banks by Nama for £1.1bn after the Irish financial crisis. The sale was completed in June 2014, with the portfolio being sold to Cerberus Capital Management for £1.3bn.

Cerberus won the bid after Pacific Investment Management Company (PIMCO) withdrew their bid upon realising that a former Nama adviser, Frank Cushnahan (who had resigned from that role in November 2013) was in line for a £5m payment upon the completion of the sale. Ian Coulter, a managing partner of Tugans (a law firm based in Belfast that were working for PIMCO) was also set to benefit from the sale.

Despite learning of these planned payments, Nama did not suspend the sales process, and the portfolio was subsequently bought by Cerberus, who were also represented by Tughans. Commenting upon this in a Public Accounts Committee hearing, Sinn Féin TD, Mary Lou McDonald said the following:"...you [Nama] take out the purchaser [PIMCO]. That identity changes but lo and behold you've the same cast of characters in and about the final decision."

Mick Wallace's claims 
On 2 July 2015, independent TD, Mick Wallace, speaking under parliamentary privilege in the Dáil Éireann, claimed that Tughans had put £7m in an Isle of Man bank account after the Project Eagle sale, and that it was "earmarked for a Northern Ireland politician". Wallace has since expanded on these claims, adding that "a Nama insider" helped ensure that Cerberus' bid won. Wallace claims that he has been threatened by Cerberus on account of the allegations he made.

In September 2015, Wallace further alleged that a further £45m had been set aside in "fixer fees" and that the £7m earmarked for a Northern Ireland politician was "only for openers".

Jamie Bryson's blog 
On 6 July 2015, in a blog post entitled "The Sordid World of the Swish Family Robinson", loyalist protestor Jamie Bryson claimed that Frank Cushnahan, while still an adviser to Nama on the Project Eagle sale, "made unsolicited approaches to potential buyers of NAMA property ... offering them the opportunity to purchase the properties for at times as little as a third of their value". The blog names Tughan's partner, Ian Coulter, First Minister of Northern Ireland Peter Robinson, and his son, Gareth Robinson, as well as Frank Cushnahan as the intended beneficiaries of the £7m "fixers fee". Bryson claimed that these allegations were not being reported in the mainstream media because libel lawyer Paul Tweed had taken out an injunction on behalf of Peter Robinson. The blog post also claimed that Gareth Robinson was a cocaine addict."This brief account only scratches the surface, what lies beneath is much more frightening." - Jamie Bryson, 6 July 2015On 8 July, a second blog challenged Gareth Robinson to give a sworn affidavit that he had never taken cocaine. Bryson claimed that the lack of legal action taken against him by the DUP or Peter Robinson proved the veracity of his allegations.

References 

2015 in British politics
2015 in politics
2015 in the United Kingdom
2015 scandals
Political scandals in Northern Ireland
Political scandals in the United Kingdom
Democratic Unionist Party scandals
Corruption in the United Kingdom